Vasilije Krestić (born 20 July 1932) is a Serbian historian and a member of the Serbian Academy of Sciences and Arts.

Biography
As a historian, he focuses on the history of the Serbs of the Habsburg monarchy. In his early career, Krestić wrote about the history of Croatia before and after the Nagodba of 1868, with special reference to the Serbs of Croatia and in Hungary. He has written numerous articles on related subjects.

In the mid-1980s Krestić became involved in the politics of nationalist opposition to communism in Serbia. He became a voice of discontent regarding the status of the Serbs of Croatia and helped to revive Serbian nationalism. He was one of the leading authors of the 1986 Memorandum of the Serbian Academy of Sciences and Arts, which was a founding document in the creation of the Serbian nationalist movement of the 1980s. Krestić's main contribution was in the sections that described the genocide against Serbs perpetrated by the Croatian fascist Ustasha in the Independent State of Croatia. Nationalist professors led by Krestić removed Dr. Drago Roksandić from the University of Belgrade in 1989, causing nine professors to publish an open letter in defence of Roksandić in the March 1990 issue of The New York Review of Books. In 1995, Krestić published a defense of the Memorandum, with Kosta Mihailović, another of the Memorandum's original authors. Krestić was also active in the defense of Slobodan Milošević before the International Criminal Tribunal for the former Yugoslavia (ICTY).

His son Petar Krestić is also prominent Serbian historian.

Major works

References

1932 births
Living people
People from Novi Kneževac
20th-century Serbian historians
Historians of the Balkans
21st-century Serbian historians
Members of the Serbian Academy of Sciences and Arts
Serbian nationalists
Eastern Orthodox Christians from Serbia